Xacobeo Galicia was a professional continental cycling team from Spain. It competed in the UCI Europe Tour and, when selected as a wild card, in UCI ProTour events. The creation of the team was announced on July 11, 2006, as Fundación Ciclismo Galego following the withdrawal of four of the nine Spanish professional cycling teams from the sport. Xacobeo Galicia was managed by Rodrigo Rodriguez, with assistance from directeur sportif Álvaro Pino, Jesús Blanco Villar and José Angel Vidal.

The team received wildcard invitations to the Vuelta a España in 2007 and 2008.

It disappeared in 2010 following the withdrawal of the Xunta de Galicia as sponsors.

History
In 2006, the Galician regional government, the Xunta de Galicia, proposed the creation of a Galician professional cycling team in an attempt to emulate the success the Basque government-sponsored  team.

The project received not only the economic support of the Xunta but that of the former Russian international footballer Valery Karpin, who following his retirement had set up Valery Karpin, S.L., a property company in the region.

On August 26, 2008, with the acquisition of a new sponsor the team changed its name from Karpin Galicia to Xacobeo Galicia.

Wins

2007
1st Clásica de Almería
1st Stage 2 GP Torres Vedras
1st Stage 6 & 9 Volta a Portugal
2008
1st Stage 3 Tour of the Basque Country
1st Overall Presidential Cycling Tour of Turkey
1st Overall Clasica Alcobendas
1st Stage 1
1st Overall Volta a Catalunya
1st Stage 15 Vuelta a España
2009
1st Stage 2 Presidential Cycling Tour of Turkey
1st Vuelta a La Rioja
1st Stage 4 GP Paredes Rota dos Moveis
1st Stage 3 Vuelta a la Comunidad de Madrid
1st Stage 5 Vuelta a Burgos
1st Stage 9 Vuelta a España
2010 
1st Circuito de Getxo
1st Stage 20 Vuelta a España

Former riders
As of July 20, 2010.

References

External links
Official website

Defunct cycling teams based in Spain
Sports teams in Galicia (Spain)
Cycling teams established in 2007
Sports clubs disestablished in 2010